Amy Watkins (1972–1999) was a social worker from Topeka, Kansas, who was murdered while walking down the street on March 8, 1999, in Brooklyn, New York.  Her death sparked widespread dismay in New York City, where the murder rate had been steadily dropping since 1990, and days later 300 marchers expressed their grief with a candlelight march on her Prospect Heights street.  Mayor Rudy Giuliani attended her wake.

Watkins graduated from the University of Kansas in 1996, and was a student at the Hunter College School of Social Work at the time of her death. Both institutions established scholarships in her name.  The New York City chapter of the National Association of Social Workers also renamed a scholarship in her honor.

Police investigation 
The NYPD was unable to make an arrest in the Watkins case for over a year, until August 2000, when one of the assailants boasted of the crime.  Two men were ultimately convicted in 2001, David Jamison and Felix Rodriguez, and both received lengthy prison sentences.  The case also made headlines because, during the course of the trial, Amy's father Lawrence Watkins, a teacher at Dominican Academy and at New York University, and his wife Gayle Greene Watkins, established a close relationship with the mother of the main perpetrator, Jamison.

See also 
 Timeline of New York City crimes and disasters

References

External links 

 Novelist gives to KU Watkins Fund

1973 births
1999 deaths
People from Topeka, Kansas
University of Kansas alumni
Silberman School of Social Work at Hunter College alumni
American social workers
American murder victims
People murdered in New York City
Deaths by stabbing in New York (state)
People from Prospect Heights, Brooklyn
 1999 murders in the United States